The Săuca is a left tributary of the river Santău in Romania. It flows into the Santău near Sudurău.

References

Rivers of Romania
Rivers of Satu Mare County